Elections to Fermanagh District Council were held on 5 May 2011 on the same day as the other Northern Irish local government elections. The election used four district electoral areas to elect a total of 23 councillors.

Election results

Note: "Votes" are the first preference votes.

Districts summary

|- class="unsortable" align="centre"
!rowspan=2 align="left"|Ward
! % 
!Cllrs
! % 
!Cllrs
! %
!Cllrs
! %
!Cllrs
! %
!Cllrs
!rowspan=2|TotalCllrs
|- class="unsortable" align="center"
!colspan=2 bgcolor="" | Sinn Féin
!colspan=2 bgcolor="" | UUP
!colspan=2 bgcolor="" | DUP
!colspan=2 bgcolor="" | SDLP
!colspan=2 bgcolor="white"| Others
|-
|align="left"|Enniskillen
|24.9
|2
|bgcolor="40BFF5"|25.9
|bgcolor="40BFF5"|2
|22.6
|1
|15.1
|1
|11.5
|0
|7
|-
|align="left"|Erne East
|bgcolor="#008800"|55.2
|bgcolor="#008800"|4
|18.8
|1
|15.7
|1
|6.1
|0
|4.2
|2
|6
|-
|align="left"|Erne North
|21.5
|1
|bgcolor="40BFF5"|34.1
|bgcolor="40BFF5"|2
|21.5
|1
|12.9
|1
|10.0
|0
|5
|-
|align="left"|Erne West
|bgcolor="#008800"|40.6
|bgcolor="#008800"|2
|19.2
|1
|9.6
|0
|17.0
|1
|13.6
|1
|5
|- class="unsortable" class="sortbottom" style="background:#C9C9C9"
|align="left"| Total
|36.6
|9
|24.0
|6
|17.3
|4
|12.5
|3
|9.6
|1
|23
|-
|}

District results

Enniskillen

2005: 2 x Sinn Féin, 2 x DUP, 2 x SDLP, 1 x UUP
2011: 2 x UUP, 2 x Sinn Féin, 2 x DUP, 1 x SDLP
2005-2011 Change: UUP gain from SDLP

Erne East

2005: 3 x Sinn Féin, 1 x UUP, 1 x DUP, 1 x SDLP
2011: 4 x Sinn Féin, 1 x UUP, 1 x DUP
2005-2011 Change: Sinn Féin gain from SDLP

Erne North

2005: 2 x UUP, 1 x DUP, 1 x Sinn Féin, 1 x SDLP
2011: 2 x UUP, 1 x DUP, 1 x Sinn Féin, 1 x SDLP
2005-2011 Change: No change

Erne West

2005: 3 x Sinn Féin, 1 x UUP, 1 x SDLP
2011: 2 x Sinn Féin, 1 x UUP, 1 x SDLP, 1 x Independent
2005-2011 Change: Independent leaves Sinn Féin

References

2011 Northern Ireland local elections
Fermanagh District Council elections
21st century in County Fermanagh